The Bishop of Ludlow was an episcopal title used by a suffragan bishop of the Church of England Diocese of Hereford, which is within the Province of Canterbury, England.

The See of Ludlow was erected under the Suffragans Nomination Act 1888 by Order in Council dated 23 September 1981 and was the only suffragan see in the Diocese of Hereford. The bishop assisted the Bishop of Hereford; in vacancies in the See of Hereford, the Bishop of Ludlow was usually the acting diocesan bishop. In 2020, it was announced by the Diocese that no new appointment would be made to the See for the time being.

The title takes its name after the historic market town of Ludlow in south Shropshire.

List of Bishops of Ludlow

See also

Archdeacon of Ludlow

References

External links
Crockford's Clerical Directory - Listings

Bishops of Ludlow
Anglican suffragan bishops in the Diocese of Hereford
Religion in Shropshire
L